Balidhiig, also known as Balli Dhiig is a town in the Togdheer region of Somaliland, on the border of Somaliland and Ethiopia.

Demographics
The town of Balidhiig has a population of 30,000 residents.

See also
Administrative divisions of Somaliland
Regions of Somaliland
Districts of Somaliland
Somalia–Somaliland border

References

External links
Geographic Names

Cities in Somaliland
Populated places in Togdheer
Ethiopia–Somaliland border crossings